Golden Death may refer to:

 "Golden Death", ninth episode of the 1966 Doctor Who serial The Daleks' Master Plan
 Golden death of almond